Jan Ahlvik (born 14 January 1983) is a Finnish footballer who represents Vaasan Palloseura of Veikkausliiga.

Ahlvik played for Esse IK, FF Jaro, Vaasan Palloseura and FC Korsholm before joining Vasa IFK. In 2006, he joined English non-league side Ashton United on loan. In 2008, he rejoined Vaasan Palloseura

References

External links
Guardian Football

1983 births
Living people
People from Pedersöre
Finnish footballers
Finnish expatriate footballers
FF Jaro players
Vaasan Palloseura players
Ashton United F.C. players
Veikkausliiga players
Association football defenders
Sportspeople from Ostrobothnia (region)